The Railway King (German: Der Eisenbahnkönig) is a 1921 German silent drama film directed by Eugen Illés and starring Fritz Kortner, Hermann Vallentin and Artúr Somlay. It was released in two parts, premiering at the Marmorhaus.

The film's sets were designed by the art director Fritz Kraenke and August Rinaldi.

Cast
 Fritz Kortner
 Hermann Vallentin
 Artúr Somlay
 Heinrich Peer
 Carl Schönfeld
 Jaro Fürth
 Danny Guertler
 Ruth Larrisson
 Emil Rameau
 Preben J. Rist
 Genia Vallot
 Anna von Palen

References

Bibliography
 Grange, William. Cultural Chronicle of the Weimar Republic. Scarecrow Press, 2008.

External links

1921 films
Films of the Weimar Republic
Films directed by Eugen Illés
German silent feature films
1921 drama films
German drama films
National Film films
Rail transport films
German black-and-white films
Silent drama films
1920s German films